Joseph W. “Joe” Pfeifer (born 1956) is a retired Assistant Chief of the New York City Fire Department (FDNY), the current first deputy commissioner of the department, and the founder of the department's Center for Terrorism and Disaster Preparedness (CTDP). He was also a first responder to and survivor of the September 11 attacks, and the first senior fire chief to respond to the World Trade Center that day.

Career
A native of Queens, New York, Pfeifer enrolled in the Cathedral College of the Immaculate Conception in 1974 with major in psychology and a minor in philosophy, and graduated in 1978. started his career as a firefighter in 1981, with his first assignment to Engine 234 in Crown Heights, Brooklyn, and promoted to Lieutenant in August 1987, then Battalion Chief in 1997.

After the September 11 attacks, Pfeifer left Battalion 1 and served as the Chief of Planning & Strategy of the FDNY Bureau of Operations. He also made his effort to create the CTDP, (Center for Terrorism and Disaster Preparedness) which was formally opened in 2004. On November 5, 2009, Pfeifer was promoted from Deputy Assistant Chief to Assistant Chief. During his tenure as the Chief of CTDP, Pfeifer played a vital role on the Effects of Hurricane Sandy in New York in 2012, served as an Incident Commander at the Metro North commuter train derailment at Spuyten Duyvil in 2013, and assisted in developing the Ebola response in NYC in 2014.

In July 2018, Pfeifer retired from FDNY after 37 years of service, making him the last fire chief on site of the September 11 Attacks to leave the FDNY. On September 12, 2021, he was awarded with Knight of the Ordre national du Mérite at the Consulate General of France, New York City by Philippe Étienne, Ambassador of France to the United States.

Role during the September 11th attacks 
On September 11, 2001, Pfeifer was Chief of Battalion 1 and therefore responsible for the tip of Manhattan, including the World Trade Center. He had celebrated his 20th anniversary with the FDNY six days earlier and was therefore eligible for retirement.

At 8:46 a.m., while Pfeifer led the response to reports of a possible gas leak at the intersection of Church Street and Lispenard Street, American Airlines Flight 11 flew over the firefighters' heads and struck the North Tower. Franco-American filmmaker Jules Naudet, who with his brother Gédéon had been filming a documentary about Pfeifer's firehouse, captured the only known footage of the North Tower impact. As he drove to the World Trade Center, Pfeifer radioed that he identified the airliner as an "American Airlines plane" and observed it "aiming" for the North Tower. Arriving minutes later, he established an Incident Command Post in the lobby of the North Tower and coordinated the FDNY's response with other chiefs as they arrived on site. When Jules Naudet asked if he could stay, Pfeifer responded, "I want you right next to me. Never leave my side."

Although the South Tower had not yet been hit, Pfeifer ordered civilian evacuations of both towers out of an abundance of caution. He personally ordered hundreds of firefighters – including his brother Kevin, a lieutenant with Engine 33 – to ascend the stairs in the North Tower to rescue people trapped at and above the impact zone. He continued to manage the unprecedented crisis after the crash of United Airlines Flight 175 into the South Tower. As people began jumping to escape the intense fire and smoke in the towers, Pfeifer tried in vain to ask them to wait to be rescued over the building's public address system. When the South Tower collapsed, causing an avalanche of dust and debris, he abandoned the command post in the North Tower and escaped via a pedestrian bridge to the World Financial Center, bringing with him a number of survivors as well as the body of his friend and FDNY Chaplain, Father Mychal Judge. Although Pfeifer didn't immediately comprehend that the South Tower had collapsed, he ordered all firefighters to evacuate the North Tower. At 10:28 a.m., he witnessed the collapse of the North Tower from across the street and covered Jules Naudet with his body to protect him from the flying concrete and steel. Coated in dust, the battalion chief regrouped with Deputy Chief Peter Hayden to coordinate the first rescue efforts. Without the infrastructure to fight the fires that had started in WTC-7 during the attacks, Pfeifer and the surviving firefighters could only watch as another skyscraper burned out of control before collapsing at 5:20 p.m.

In recent years, Pfeifer has publicly discussed his experience on September 11th in detail, including in his 2021 book, Ordinary Heroes: A Memoir of 9/11, and in an interview for the 2021 National Geographic documentary series 9/11: One Day in America. His decision to allow the Naudet brothers to stay and film the crisis as it unfolded both confirmed his account of events and resulted in the only record of the World Trade Center attacks from start to finish.

Education and personal life
Pfeifer holds a Master of Public Administration (M.P.A.) from Harvard Kennedy School, a Master in Security Studies from the Naval Postgraduate School, and a Master in Theology from Immaculate Conception.

Pfeifer married his wife, Ginny, on June 3, 1984. They have two children, respectively Christine the elder, and Greg the younger. Pfeifer's brother, Kevin J. Pfeifer, was also a FDNY firefighter, who died at the North Tower on the day of September 11, and had once reached the 32nd floor with Engine 33. Kevin was last seen by survivor FDNY Captain Dennis Tardio on the 9th floor of North Tower.8

References

1956 births
Living people
People from Queens, New York
New York City firefighters
Survivors of the September 11 attacks
Knights of the Ordre national du Mérite
Harvard Kennedy School alumni
Naval Postgraduate School alumni